.mp is the Internet country code top-level domain (ccTLD) for Northern Mariana Islands.  There are a few sites related to the Northern Mariana Islands in this domain (such as governmental sites under .gov.mp and a few sites in .org.mp and .co.mp). The get.mp site allows users to register and manage .mp domains. The .mp name comes from ISO 3166 which specifies MP as the two letter designation for the Northern Mariana Islands.

Official registry site 
Domain name registry services for .mp domains are operated by Saipan DataCom, a local ISP. Domains with four or more characters may be purchased for $20.  Premium domains under four characters range in price, with two-character domains running $5,000 for a three-year registration. There are some sites related to the Northern Mariana Islands under third-level domains .gov.mp and .co.mp.

Whois services 
The MP Domain does not have public whois services available. Saipan DataCom will provide whois data in cases of potential trademark infringement. Although ICANN documents specify whois.nic.mp as of July 2018 this host does not resolve.

Chi.mp
Saipan DataCom formerly operated chi.mp, a content hub and identity management platform providing .mp domains and websites. Old free .mp registrations provided earlier by chi.mp were terminated without a notice and the chi.mp web site has been defunct since at least May 2013. As of August 2021 get.mp is offering chi.mp for sale for $20,000.00. Mailchimp uses .mp as a domain hack (mailchi.mp) to redirect to its main website.

Notes and references

See also 
Internet in the United States
Internet in the Northern Mariana Islands
.us

External links 
 get.mp Registry
 IANA Delegation Record for .mp
 Registry Terms and Privacy
 List of gov.mp and co.mp domains in Google's index.

Country code top-level domains
Communications in the Northern Mariana Islands

sv:Toppdomän#M